Albert John Allen (16 October 1891 – ) was an English professional footballer who played in the Football League for Glossop, Manchester City, Southport and Crewe Alexandra as a full back.

Personal life 
Allen served in Italy as a lieutenant in the British Armed Forces during the First World War. After retiring from football, he worked for the Royal London Mutual Insurance Society.

Career statistics

Honours 
Manchester City

 Lancashire Senior Cup: 1920–21

References

1891 births
1971 deaths
Military personnel from Manchester
People from Moston, Manchester
English footballers
Glossop North End A.F.C. players
Manchester City F.C. players
Southport F.C. players
Crewe Alexandra F.C. players
Lancaster City F.C. players
English Football League players
Southport F.C. wartime guest players
British Army personnel of World War I
Association football fullbacks
British Army officers

Ashton United F.C. players